Catharina Wallenstedt, née Wallia (1627 – 1719) was a Swedish letter writer and courtier. She is known for her collection of letters. Composed of a collection of about 350 letters written between 1673 and 1718, mostly to her spouse and daughter Greta, they have been the object of research.

Catharina Wallenstedt was the daughter of Bishop Laurentius Olai Wallius and Catharina Tidemansdotter, and was alongside her siblings ennobled in 1650. She was maid of honour to Queen Christina of Sweden in 1649–1655. In 1655 she married Edvard Ehrenstéen (died 1686). She was the mother-in-law to Nils Gyldenstolpe and Arvid Horn.

She was portrayed in the "Teckningar ur svenska adelns familjelif i gamla tider" by Ellen Fries (1895).

References

 Eva Österberg, red (1997). Jämmerdal & Fröjdesal. Kvinnor i stormaktstidens Sverige. Stockholm: Atlantis AB.  
 Gustaf Elgenstierna, Den introducerade svenska adelns ättartavlor. 1925-36
 Gustaf Elgenstierna, Den introducerade svenska adelns ättartavlor. 1925-36
 Gabriel Anrep : Svenska adelns ättar-taflor / Afdelning 4. Skytte af Duderhoff - Östner, jemte tillägg, rättelser och slutord

Further reading 
 

1627 births
Swedish ladies-in-waiting
1719 deaths
17th-century Swedish women writers
17th-century letter writers
Women letter writers
17th-century Swedish writers
People of the Swedish Empire
18th-century letter writers
Court of Christina, Queen of Sweden
Swedish letter writers
18th-century Swedish writers